Golovsky is a rural locality (a khutor) in Kumylzhenskoye Rural Settlement, Kumylzhensky District, Volgograd Oblast, Russia. The population was 16 as of 2010.

Geography 
Golovsky is located in forest steppe, on Khopyorsko-Buzulukskaya Plain, on the bank of the Kumylga River, 7 km north of Kumylzhenskaya (the district's administrative centre) by road. Chunosovsky is the nearest rural locality.

References 

Rural localities in Kumylzhensky District